The 2021 FIVB Volleyball Men's Club World Championship was the 16th edition of the competition. It was held in Betim, Brazil for the second consecutive time from 7 to 11 December 2021.

Sada Cruzeiro won their 4th title of the world champions, having beaten Cucine Lube Civitanova in the final (3–0).

Qualification

 Cucine Lube Civitanova replaced ZAKSA Kędzierzyn-Koźle which has decided to withdraw from the competition.

Venue

Pools composition

Squads

Pool ranking criteria

Ranking system:
 Number of victories
 Match points
 Set ratio
 Setpoint ratio
 H2H results

Preliminary round
All times are Brasília Time (UTC−03:00).

Pool A

|}

|}

Pool B

|}

|}

Final round
All times are Brasília Time (UTC−03:00).

Semifinals
|}

3rd place match
|}

Final
|}

Final standings

Awards

Most Valuable Player
 Miguel Ángel López (Sada Cruzeiro)
Best Setter
 Fernando Kreling (Sada Cruzeiro) 
Best Outside Spikers
 Alessandro Michieletto (Itas Trentino)
 Miguel Ángel López (Sada Cruzeiro)

Best Middle Blockers
 Otávio Pinto (Sada Cruzeiro)
 Robertlandy Simón (Cucine Lube Civitanova)
Best Opposite Spiker
 Wallace de Souza (Sada Cruzeiro)
Best Libero
 Fabio Balaso (Cucine Lube Civitanova)

References

External links
Official website

FIVB Volleyball Men's Club World Championship
FIVB Men's Club World Championship
FIVB Men's Club World Championship
2021 FIVB Men's Club World Championship
FIVB